Gora Nevskaya (meaning "Nevsky Mountain"), is a mountain in the Omsukchan Range, Kolyma Mountains. Administratively it is part of the Magadan Oblast, Russian Federation.

The highest point in Magadan Oblast, however, is the highest peak of the Okhandya Range. 

A Dalstroy Aviation Antonov An-2 crashed on the mountainside by Mount Nevskaya in June 1951.

See also
List of mountains in Russia

References

Mountains of Russia
Kolyma Mountains
Landforms of Magadan Oblast